Jean-Pierre Kutwa (born 22 December 1945) is a prelate of the Roman Catholic Church who has served as the Metropolitan Archbishop of Abidjan in the Ivory Coast since May 2006. On 12 January 2014, Pope Francis announced that Kutwa would be made a cardinal in February 2014.

Biography
Kutwa was born on 22 December 1945 in Blockhauss (Abidjan).  He had initial studies the school St Jean-Bosco, Treichville, in 1950; on 18 September 1955, he entered the "Petit-Clerc", Bingerville in class of CMI; in 1957, he entered the Minor Seminary in Bingerville, where he completed his secondary studies.

Education
On 2 October 1964, he entered the Grand Seminary of Anyama, where he studied philosophy and theology; on 22 December 1967, he received the cassock and the ecclesiastical tonsure; he received the diaconate on 20 December 1970, from Archbishop Bernard Yago of Abidjan, in the church of Notre Dame du Perpétuel Secours in Treichville; also, he studied at the Catholic Institute of Occidental Africa (I.C.A.O.), where he obtained a maîtrise in Biblical theology; and at the Pontifical Urbaniana University, Rome, where he earned a doctorate in Biblical theology.

Priesthood and Episcopate
He was ordained a priest on 11 July 1971 by Cardinal Bernard Yago. Pope John-Paul II named him archbishop of the archdiocese of Gagnoa on 15 May 2001. He was consecrated bishop on 16 September by Cardinal Bernard Agré, Archbishop of Abidjan. 

He took part in the Synod of Bishops that met at the Vatican in October 2005 as a delegate of the bishops of the Ivory Coast.

In May 2006, Pope Benedict XVI transferred him to the metropolitan see of Abidjan to succeed the retiring Cardinal Agré.

Following the violence in the Ivory Coast that followed the November 2010 elections and ended in April 2011, he called for reconciliation: "Yes, the Ivory Coast must be a land of friendship and brotherhood, from the North or from the South, black or white, from here or elsewhere." In January 2012, speaking on behalf of the National Forum of Religious Groups, he called for Alassane Ouattara, President of the Ivory Coast and a Muslim, to release political prisoners, supporters of his defeated rival for the presidency, in order to facilitate the process of national reconciliation.

Kutwa is the president of the bishops commission for ecumenism as well as vice-president of the Regional Episcopal Conference of Francophone West Africa.

Cardinal
On 12 January 2014, Pope Francis announced that he would name Kutwa a cardinal at the papal consistory scheduled for 22 February 2014, along with 18 others. He was created Cardinal-Priest of Santa Emerenziana a Tor Fiorenza in February 2014.

In September 2014, he was appointed a member of the Congregation for the Evangelization of Peoples, Congregation for Institutes of Consecrated Life and Societies of Apostolic Life, Pontifical Council for Laity, and Pontifical Council for Justice and Peace.

Kutwa is also a composer.

See also
Cardinals created by Francis

References

External links

 
 Jean-Pierre Kutwa
 Diocese of Abidjan
 Images

 

|-
 

|-
 

1945 births
Living people
21st-century Roman Catholic archbishops in Africa
Pontifical Urban University alumni
Ivorian Roman Catholic archbishops
Members of the Congregation for the Evangelization of Peoples
Cardinals created by Pope Francis
Ivorian cardinals
People from Abidjan
Members of the Congregation for Institutes of Consecrated Life and Societies of Apostolic Life
Members of the Pontifical Council for the Laity
Members of the Pontifical Council for Justice and Peace
Roman Catholic archbishops of Abidjan